The Leo Supercluster is a supercluster in the Northern Celestial Hemisphere that stretches across the constellations Ursa Major and Leo. It covers an area approximately 130 megaparsecs long by 60 megaparsecs wide. The redshifts of member galaxy clusters range from 0.032 to 0.043. The brightest cluster in the system is Abell 1185.

See also
 Abell catalog
 Large scale structure of the universe
 List of Abell clusters
 List of superclusters

References

 
Leo (constellation)
Ursa Major (constellation)